Early general elections were held in Malta on 12 April 1904, after all the candidates elected in February resigned immediately after the elections in protest against the 1903 "Chamberlain" Constitution. All eight candidates were again unopposed and all resigned immediately after the elections. However, fresh elections were not called until 1907.

Background
The elections were held under the Chamberlain Constitution, with members elected from eight single-member constituencies.

Results
A total of 7,991 people were registered to vote, but no votes were cast as all candidates were unopposed.

References

General elections in Malta
Malta
1904 in Malta
Single-candidate elections
Uncontested elections
April 1904 events